This is a listing of the horses that finished in either first, second, or third place and the number of starters in the Squan Song Stakes, an American stakes race for three-year-olds at 7 furlongs/8 miles on dirt. It is held at Laurel Park Racecourse in Laurel, Maryland.  (List 1988–present)

References 

Laurel Park Racecourse